Shaq Fu: Da Return is the second studio album by American basketball player and rapper Shaquille O'Neal.  It was released on November 8, 1994, for Jive Records and featured production from Redman, Erick Sermon, Def Jef and Warren G. The album, while not as successful as his previous album, still found decent success, peaking at number 67 on the Billboard 200 and number 19 on the Top R&B/Hip-Hop Albums.

It also spawned two singles, "Biological Didn't Bother" (which discusses O'Neal's estrangement from his biological father, with whom he would not reconcile until 2016) and "No Hook" which featured Wu-Tang Clan members, Method Man and RZA. The album was certified Gold by the RIAA. The kanji —meaning 'wind'—is used on the cover, which can be pronounced as 'fu' in Japanese. It has no relation to the 'fu' in 'kung fu' of which the album references its name.

Critical reception

In a review for AllMusic, JT Griffith called the album "a solid (but not outstanding) rap CD that takes another step forward in that no-man's land between legitimacy and novelty act."

Track listing

Charts

Weekly charts

Certifications

References

Shaquille O'Neal albums
1994 albums
Jive Records albums
Albums produced by RZA
Albums produced by Erick Sermon
Albums produced by Warren G